This is a list of the members of the Dewan Negara (Senate) of the Ninth Parliament of Malaysia.

Elected by the State Legislative Assembly

Nominated by the Prime Minister and appointed by the Yang di-Pertuan Agong

Death in office
 Jinuin Jimin (d. 12 July 1998)
 Zainol Abidin Johari (d. 20 July 1998)

Footnotes

References

Malaysian parliaments
Lists of members of the Dewan Negara